Nakai Snowfield is a snowfield at about  elevation that occupies the col between Mount Hercules and Mount Jason in Olympus Range, McMurdo Dry Valleys. Named by Advisory Committee on Antarctic Names (US-ACAN) (2004) after Nobuyuki Nakai, Department of Earth Sciences, Nagoya University, Nagoya, Japan; a participant in the McMurdo Dry Valleys Drilling Project, 1973–76.

Landforms of Victoria Land
Snow fields of the Ross Dependency
McMurdo Dry Valleys